Mognéville is a commune in the Meuse department in Grand Est in north-eastern France.

On 29 August 1944, the 3rd Panzergenadier Division  of the  German Wehrmacht massacred 86 inhabitants of this and the three neighboring villages of Beurey-sur-Saulx, Couvonges and  Robert-Espagne. This is also referred to as the Massacre de la vallée de la Saulx.

See also 
 Communes of the Meuse department

References

Communes of Meuse (department)
War crimes in France